The 2016 Wilde Lexus Women's USTA Pro Circuit Event was a professional tennis tournament played on outdoor clay courts. It was the eighth edition of the tournament and part of the 2016 ITF Women's Circuit, offering a total of $50,000 in prize money. It took place in Osprey, Florida, United States, on 28 March–3 April 2016.

Singles main draw entrants

Seeds 

 1 Rankings as of 21 March 2016.

Other entrants 
The following players received wildcards into the singles main draw:
  Jennifer Brady
  Sophia Edwards
  Jamie Loeb

The following players received entry from the qualifying draw:
  Arantxa Rus
  Amra Sadiković
  Anne Schäfer
  İpek Soylu

The following player received an entry by a lucky loser spot:
  Sophie Chang

Champions

Singles

 Madison Brengle def.  Lara Arruabarrena, 4–6, 6–4, 6–3

Doubles

 Asia Muhammad /  Taylor Townsend def.  Louisa Chirico /  Katerina Stewart, 6–1, 6–7(5–7), [10–4]

External links 
 2016 Wilde Lexus Women's USTA Pro Circuit Event at ITFtennis.com
 

2016 ITF Women's Circuit
2016 in American tennis
Tennis tournaments in the United States
Tennis tournaments in Florida
2016 in sports in Florida